Womens Bay is a census-designated place (CDP) in Kodiak Island Borough, Alaska, United States. At the 2020 census the population was 743, up from 719 in 2010. The name is correctly spelled "Womens", without an apostrophe.

Geography

Demographics

Womens Bay first appeared on the 1990 U.S. Census as a census-designated place (CDP).

As of the census of 2000, there were 690 people, 251 households, and 175 families residing in the CDP.  The population density was 15.8 people per square mile (6.1/km2). There were 269 housing units at an average density of 6.2/sq mi (2.4/km2). The racial makeup of the CDP was 85.80% White, 0.58% Black or African American, 6.09% Native American, 1.45% Asian, and 6.09% from two or more races. 1.74% of the population were Hispanic or Latino of any race.

There were 251 households, out of which 40.2% had children under the age of 18 living with them, 57.4% were married couples living together, 8.8% had a female householder with no husband present, and 29.9% were non-families. 23.9% of all households were made up of individuals, and 1.6% had someone living alone who was 65 years of age or older. The average household size was 2.75 and the average family size was 3.28.

In the CDP, the population was spread out, with 30.7% under the age of 18, 6.8% from 18 to 24, 36.1% from 25 to 44, 24.2% from 45 to 64, and 2.2% who were 65 years of age or older. The median age was 35 years. For every 100 females, there were 113.0 males. For every 100 females age 18 and over, there were 116.3 males.

The median income for a household in the CDP was $72,083, and the median income for a family was $71,250. Males had a median income of $49,792 versus $40,605 for females. The per capita income for the CDP was $27,746. None of the population was living below the poverty line.

References

Census-designated places in Alaska
Census-designated places in Kodiak Island Borough, Alaska
Populated coastal places in Alaska on the Pacific Ocean